The 2009 Victorian Premier League season was held between February and September 2009.

Teams

Victorian Premier League teams for the 2009 season:

Promotion and relegation
Teams promoted from Division 1:
(After the end of the 2008 season.)
 Dandenong Thunder SC
 Sunshine George Cross FC

Teams relegated to Division 1:
(After the end of the 2008 season.)
 Fawkner Blues SC
 Frankston Pines FC
 Western Suburbs SC

Teams ceasing competition
(After the end of the 2008 season.)
 Australian Institute of Sport

League table
The regular season concluded on 15 August.

Finals Series

Qualifying Final

Elimination Final

Minor Semi-Final

Major Semi-Final

Preliminary final

Grand final

Victoria Men's Team 2009
A Victoria Men's Team consisting of Victorian Premier League players formed to compete against Melbourne Victory for two Victorian bushfire charity appeals matches. The games were scheduled for 12 May and 20 May. Victoria coach Chris Taylor stated that the players were selected "on the basis that some...may go on to play in the national competition in the future."

The players selected to represent Victoria were:

Source

Notes

See also
 Victorian Premier League
 Football Federation Victoria

References

External links
 Football Federation Victoria

Victorian Premier League, 2009
2009
2009 domestic association football leagues